Sherman R. Moulton (June 10, 1876 – June 16, 1949) was a Vermont attorney and judge.  He is most notable for his service as an associate justice of the Vermont Supreme Court (1926-1939) and as Chief Justice (1939-1949).

Early life
Sherman Roberts Moulton was born in New York City on June 10, 1876, the son of Annie Jane Roberts and Clarence Freeman Moulton.  He was raised in Randolph, Vermont, and graduated from Randolph High School.  Moulton was an 1898 graduate of Dartmouth College, and in 1901 he received his LL.B. from Harvard Law School.  He completed his legal training with attorney Joseph D. Denison of Randolph, and attained admission to the bar in October 1901.

Start of career
Moulton was an attorney for the Rutland Railroad from 1902 to 1903, and then worked as an associate at the Townsend & Avery firm in New York City.  In 1910, Moulton was one of the founding partners of Cowles, Moulton, & Stearns, a law firm located in Burlington, Vermont.  He left the firm in 1912, and established a Burlington office in which he was the principal.  Moulton was active in politics as a Republican; he was a member of the Burlington Republican Committee from 1910 to 1912, and was chairman beginning in 1911.  From 1911 to 1913, and again from 1915 to 1916, he served as Burlington's grand juror, responsible for pursuing prosecutions in the city court.

Continued career
From 1915 to 1917, Moulton was executive clerk and legal advisor to Governor Charles W. Gates.  During World War I, Moulton served as a member of Vermont's Public Safety Committee, the body formed to coordinate the state government's wartime planning and actions.  In 1918, Moulton was elected to the Vermont Senate, and he served in January, 1919.  In addition, he served as reporter of decisions for the Vermont Supreme Court.

Judicial career
In February, 1919, Moulton was appointed as a judge of the Vermont Superior Court, succeeding Eleazer L. Waterman.  He served until 1926 and advanced through seniority to chief judge.  In October 1926, he succeeded Fred M. Butler as an associate justice of the Vermont Supreme Court.  In July 1938, Moulton was appointed as chief justice of the state Supreme Court, succeeding George M. Powers.  He was succeeded as an associate justice by Olin M. Jeffords.  Moulton served as chief justice until retiring in February 1949.  He was succeeded as chief justice by associate justice John C. Sherburne.

Death and burial
Moulton died in Burlington on June 16, 1949.  He was buried at Moulton Cemetery in Randolph.

Honors
Moulton received the honorary degree of LL.D. from Boston University in 1941, and an honorary D.C.L. from the University of Vermont in 1945.

Family
In 1906, Moulton married Stella Platt (1880-1966) of Burlington.  They were the parents of a son, Horace (1907-1991), who became a successful corporate attorney.

References

Sources

Books

Newspapers

External links

1876 births
1949 deaths
People from Randolph, Vermont
People from Burlington, Vermont
Dartmouth College alumni
Harvard Law School alumni
Vermont lawyers
Republican Party Vermont state senators
Chief Justices of the Vermont Supreme Court
Burials in Vermont